Laura Gómez may refer to:
Laura Gómez (actress) (born 1979), American actress
Laura Gómez (judoka) (born 1984), Spanish Olympic judoka
Laura Gómez (speed skater) (born 1990), Colombian Olympic speed skater
Laura E. Gómez (born 1964), University of New Mexico law professor